Harry Bernard Coonce (born 1939) is an American mathematician notable for being the originator of the now-popular Mathematics Genealogy Project, launched in 1996, a web-based catalog of mathematics doctoral advisors and students.

Coonce conceived of the idea while reading the unsigned thesis of his academic advisor Malcolm Robertson, in the Princeton University library, and wondering who his advisor's advisor was. The amount of time it took Coonce, without the existence of a central database of such information, to find out that Robertson's advisor was C. Einar Hille, gave him the idea for the project. In a 2000 interview, Coonce estimated that the project would top out at about 80,000 entries. In June 2016, the number of entries surpassed 200,000.

Education
Coonce completed his PhD in 1969 at the University of Delaware with a dissertation on A Variational Method for Functions of Bounded Boundary Rotation. Coonce presently is a retired mathematics professor of Minnesota State University, Mankato.

Private life
He married Susan Schilling, a computer scientist who died in 2016.

References

20th-century American mathematicians
21st-century American mathematicians
Living people
1939 births
University of Delaware alumni
Minnesota State University, Mankato alumni